Edward Valentine Shepard (1866 – 1937) was an American auction bridge and contract bridge writer, authority, and teacher in the early twentieth century.

Life, career, and works
Shepard was a native of Salem, Massachusetts, the son of Samuel Shepard and Sarah Woodward Shepard. He was graduated from MIT in 1889 with a civil engineering degree, after which he worked in South America and Mexico as well as Massachusetts, also working for the United States Patent Office and teaching at Columbia University. He also devoted many years to his bridge career.

Shepard's engineering training led him to apply mathematical analysis to bridge. His 1913 work Scientific Auction Bridge was the first American book to deal extensively with the mathematics and distribution of bridge hands.

Shepard was one of the twelve members of the Bridge Headquarters, organized in 1931 and representing bridge's "old guard" against the insurgent Ely Culbertson.

Shepard was an honorary member of the British Bridge League and the American Bridge League. The Shepard Club, an early Portland, Maine, bridge club organized by John B. Thomes, was named in his honor.

Shepard died February 9, 1937, at home in Manhattan.

Publications

References

External links
Full text of Expert Auction (1913, Harper & Brothers) at the Hathi Trust Digital Library (also at the Internet Archive)
Full text of Correct Auction (1920, Harper & Brothers) at the Hathi Trust Digital Library

1866 births
1937 deaths
Writers from Salem, Massachusetts
Contract bridge writers